Gymnasium F.C. are a football club from Douglas on the Isle of Man. They compete in the Isle of Man Football League. They wear a blue and white striped shirt, black shorts, black socks and play their home games at Tromode Park in Douglas.

History

Gymnasium A.F.C. was founded on Saturday 11th October 1890 at a meeting held in the reading room of the Douglas Gymnasium, which was itself opened on Tuesday 12th November 1889. The meeting decided, on the casting vote of the Chairman, to adopt the Association code, rather than Rugby, which was more prevalent on the Isle of Man at the time.This meeting is fully reported in the Isle of Man Times edition dated Wednesday 15th October 1890.  

Gymns were one of eight teams that initially made up the official Manx Football League.

They have been Isle of Man Football League champions seven times, including four consecutive championships from 1902–03 to 1905–06. They have won the Manx FA Cup ten times.

The club experienced an internal power struggle during 1987, resulting in the resignation of a section of the committee and players to form  spin off club, who even took gymnasiums coloursDouglas Royal, who even copied the Gymns kit of the time and to this day consider themselves rivals (despite being in the lower leagues).

In 2001–02 they were relegated to Division Two but were promoted again the following season as runners-up. However they spent just one season back in the First Division finishing the season winning just two games. And yet again the following season, 2004–05, they were immediately promoted as runners-up. Since that time the club has consolidated its position within the top tier and continues to climb the table each season.

In addition to the Senior team, the club has a reserve team that play in the Isle of Man Football Combination

Thanks to links with a prominent Premier League club, Gymns were donated a playing kit for the 2002–03 season. Unfortunately a mix-up in communication resulted in blue/white stripe shirts being provided instead of the club's traditional all-white. As a result, Gymns altered the club colours that season to reflect this new kit, later switching the shorts and socks from blue to black and thus creating the home strip worn today.

During the 2008–09 season, the club achieved The Football Association Charter Standard status, the FA's kitemark scheme for quality assurance.
 
The club then experienced a lean spell and have been back in the second division for a number of years.

Partnerships

Gymnasium FC continue to be sponsored by Apex Interiors as at the start of the 2022–23 season.

The club is also a member of the Cronkbourne Sports & Social Club, which also includes the Cronkbourne Cricket Club and the Cronkbourne Bacchanalians Hockey Club. This partnership enables the CSSC pavilion facilities to be used during the football season to provide a further level of comfort to home and visiting players.

Honours

League
Division One champions (7): 1897–98, 1902–03, 1903–04, 1904–05, 1905–06, 1919–20, 1986–87
Division Two champions (2): 1969–70, 1973–74, 2013–14
Division Two Combination champions (2): 2013-14

Cup
Manx FA Cup (10): 1894–95, 1901–02, 1902–03, 1903–04, 1910–11, 1931–32, 1985–86, 1986–87, 1987–88, 1999–2000
Hospital Cup (3): 1921–22, 1922–23, 1986–87
Railway Cup (5): 1906–07, 1924–25, 1927–28, 1950–51, 1986–87
Omnitec Invitational Trophy (1): 2009–10
Woods Cup (1) : 2013-14

References

External links
Club website

Football clubs in the Isle of Man
1890 establishments in the Isle of Man
Association football clubs established in 1890